Coleophora isomoera is a moth of the family Coleophoridae. It is found in Spain and Morocco, Turkey, Uzbekistan, Mongolia and China.

References

isomoera
Moths described in 1972
Moths of Asia
Moths of Europe